Martha Araújo (born 1943) in Maceió, Brazil is a Brazilian sculpture and performance artist. She lives and works in Maceió the capital of Alagoas in Brazil. The style of her work was performance and sculpture art. She also explored her body with her performances. Her art emerged at the end of a military dictatorship that lasted from 1964 to 1985. She used their experiences during the dictatorship in her artwork to show how they felt trapped. Using textiles Araújo demonstrates the limit of the body through the play between repression and freedom. However, sculptures and performances were not her only interest she has also explored photography and video.

Education 
Martha Araújo studied education at Universidade Federal do Rio de Janeiro and graduated in the year of 1970. She earned a degree in pedagogy at Universidade Federal do Rio de Janeiro. She earned her master's degree in education from Pontifícia Universidade Católica do Rio de Janeiro. She was able to work under Haroldo Barroso, a sculptor, at the Museu do Ingá in Niterói throughout 1984 and 1987. In 1986 she went on to study at the Escola de Artes Visuais do Parque Lage in Rio de Janeiro.

Artwork

Hábito/Habitante, 1985
Araújo had two solo exhibitions where her performance of Hábito/Habitante was performed by participants. Araújo had a series of photographs that made up Hábito/Habitante. The performers used textile (cloth) in the shape of a half-moon stuck to a wall, another large cloth that two or more people can participate as a whole and the participants in capacete (helmet). The performers are inside a piece of cloth and move around to free themselves from repression. They try to separate from each other, so they need to work together as a whole to be able to escape. Capacete is a performance from the Hábito/Habitante series. In the Capacete performance the performers have helmets made out of cloth that are tied together.

Quardo Dobrável Espaço Real,1985
Quardo Dobrável Espaço Real, are metal plates stitched together that can be manipulated by the movement of the performer. It takes the shape of the performer when it is moving. This sculpture can be seen as plastic art because it can create a new shape.

Para um corpo nas suas impossibilidades, 1985
In this art piece she uses a ramp, a body suit with Velcro, and herself to stick herself or others to show how they feel free. They jump onto the ramp and are stuck there experiencing repression and freedom because once a person is stuck it is hard to detach themselves until they fight for freedom.

Exhibitions

Solo exhibitions 
1986 Martha Araújo: Hábito/Habitante, Galeria do Centro Empresarial, Rio de Janeiro
1994 Martha Araújo: Galeria de Arte Associação Cultural Brasil, United States, El Salvador, Brazil
2002 Martha Araújo: Entrópicos, Pinacoteca da Universidade Federal de Alagoas, Maceió, Brazil 
2015 Martha Araújo: Hábito/Habitante, Galería PM8, Vigo, Spain
2015 Martha Araújo: Para um corpo pleno de vazios, Galeria Jaqueline Martins, São Paulo

Group exhibitions 
2014  Artevida, organized by Adriano Pedrosa and Rodrigo Moura at the Escola de Artes Visuais do Parque Lage.
2018 Moving Stones Kadist Art Foundation / Paris, Ile-de-France, France

Collection 

 Galeria do Centro Empresarial, Rio de Janeiro
 Galeria de Arte Associação Cultural Brasil, United States, El Salvador, Brazil
 Escola de Artes Visuais do Parque Lage
 Galería PM8, Vigo, Spain
 Pinacoteca da Universidade Federal de Alagoas, Maceió, Brazil
 Para um corpo pleno de vazios, Galeria Jaqueline Martins, São Paulo
 Paris, Ile-de-France

Honors and awards
In 1986 Araújo was granted an award at the tenth Solão Carioca de Artes in Rio de Janeiro.

Bibliography 

 Araújo, Martha, and Manuela Moscoso. Martha Araújo: Para um corpo pleno de vazios. São Paulo: Galeria Jaqueline Martins, 2015.
 Molina, Camila. "Artista Martha Araújo vive o resgate de sua obra performática." O Estado de São Paulo, February 15, 2015.
 Munder, Heike, ed. Resistance Performed: An Anthology on Aesthetic Strategies under Repressive Regimes in Latin America. Zurich: Migros Museum für 
 Gegenwartskunst, 2015.
 Pedrosa, Adriano, ed. Artevida. Vol. 1. São Paulo: Cobogó, 2015.

References

External links 

 Biography at Galeria PM8

DIGITAL ARCHIVERADICAL WOMEN: LATIN AMERICAN ART, 1960–1985 

Martha Araújo 

Martha Araujo selected works 

1943 births
Brazilian sculptors
Brazilian performance artists
Living people